The Rt. Rev  Rodney Osborne Andrews   is a retired     Anglican bishop.

Born on 11 November 1940, educated at the University of Saskatchewan and ordained in  1965  he was involved in parish work and native ministry within the Diocese of Calgary until 1984. He was a military chaplain in the Diocese of Montreal after which he was Archdeacon of Algoma until 2000. He was Rector of St Alban's, Richmond and University Chaplain at UBC until 2004 when he became the Bishop of Saskatoon. He resigned his See in 2010. Bishop Rodney holds an airline transport pilot's licence and is currently a flight instructor.

References

1940 births
University of Saskatchewan alumni
Anglican bishops of Saskatoon
21st-century Anglican Church of Canada bishops
Living people
Canadian military chaplains